Alexey Matveyevich Olovnikov (10 October 1936 in Vladivostok, Soviet Union – 6 December 2022 in Moscow, Russia) was a Russian biologist. In 1971, he was the first to recognize the problem of telomere shortening, to predict the existence of telomerase, and to suggest the telomere hypothesis of aging and the relationship of telomeres to cancer.

Despite this discovery, he was not awarded a share of the 2009 Nobel Prize in Physiology or Medicine, awarded for the discovery of the enzyme and its biological significance. In 2009 he was awarded Demidov Prize of the Russian Academy of Sciences.

References

WNYC RadioLab Episode on Mortality

1936 births
Biogerontologists
Russian biologists
Soviet biologists
20th-century biologists
Scientists from Vladivostok
Living people
Demidov Prize laureates
Moscow State University alumni
Employees of the Gamaleya Research Institute of Epidemiology and Microbiology